Saint Valentin may refer to:

 St. Valentin, Lower Austria, Austria
 Saint-Valentin, Quebec, Canada
 Saint-Valentin, Indre department, France
 St. Valentin, Kiedrich, Germany

See also
 San Valentino (disambiguation)
 Saint Valentine
 Valentin (disambiguation)